A guerra dos mascates is a novel written by the Brazillan writer José de Alencar. It is a historical novel set during the war of the same name which occurred in Pernambuco from 1710-1711.  The novel, written in 1870 after the author's disillusionment with politics, was published in two volumes: the first in 1873, the second in 1874.  Alencar included several notes to the reader in these volumes.  In all he warns against the temptation of readers to "see contemporary characters disguised in the figures of the last century."

External links
 Full text of the book (Portuguese language site)

1871 Brazilian novels
Novels by José de Alencar
Portuguese-language novels